Power is a surname. 


People with the surname
Arthur Power (1889–1960), British admiral
Arthur Mackenzie Power (1921–1984), British admiral
Camilla Power (born 1976), British actress
Carla Power (active 2022), American author
Cat Power (born Charlyn Marshall 1972), singer
Catherine Power (disambiguation), or variants, several uses
Charles Power (disambiguation), or variants, several uses
David Power (disambiguation), or variants, several uses
Darrell Power (born 1968), Canadian musician
Dermot Power, Irish artist
Ethel B. Power (1881–1969), architectural writer and editor
Frederick Belding Power (1853–1927), American chemist
F. Danvers Power (1861–1955), Australian academic, geologist and metallurgist
Glen Power (born 1978), drummer for The Script
Harold Septimus Power (1877–1951) NZ-born Australian painter
Harry Power (1819–1892), Australian bushranger
Henry Power (1623–1668), English physician and experimenter
Henry Power (footballer) (1904–1986), Australian rules footballer 
J. D. Power III (born 1931), American businessman, of J.D. Power, the American consumer research, data, and analytics firm
James Power (disambiguation), several uses
John Power (disambiguation), several uses
Jonathon Power (born 1974), Canadian squash player
Katherine Ann Power (born 1949), US ex-convict and long-term fugitive
Lawrence Geoffrey Power (1841–1921), Canadian politician
Leonel Power (1370–1445), English composer
Louis Power (1905–1988), Australian cricketer
Luke Power (born 1980), Australian football player
Manley Power (1773–1826), British general
Manley Laurence Power (1904–1981), British admiral
Max Power (footballer) (born 1993), English footballer
Michael Power (disambiguation)
Noel Power (1929–2009), Australian judge
Owen Power (born 2002), Canadian Ice Hockey Player
Paddy Power (disambiguation), several uses
Patrick Power (disambiguation), several uses
Peter Power (disambiguation), several uses
Philip Power (born 1952), American scientist
Phil Power (born 1967), English football manager player
Ramón Power y Giralt (1775–1813), Puerto Rican politician
Richard Power (disambiguation), or variants, several uses
Robbie Power (born 1982), Irish jockey
Romina Power (born 1951), American singer and actress
Samantha Power (born 1970), American academic
Sean Power (disambiguation), several uses
Seon Power (born 1984), Trinidadian footballer
Simon Power (disambiguation), several uses
Steve Power (born 1960), British record producer 
Taryn Power (born 1953), American actress
Thomas Power (disambiguation), or variants, several uses
Tyrone Power (disambiguation), several uses
Una Power, Irish card reader and radio presenter
Victor Power (disambiguation), or Vic Power, several uses
Will Power (disambiguation), several people
William Power (disambiguation), several people
W. Tyrone Power (1819–1911), Australian artist

Fictional characters with the surname
The Power Pack superhero team: Alex Power, Julie Power, Jack Power, and Katie Power
Captain Jonathan Power, in the TV series Captain Power and the Soldiers of the Future
James Power (comics), in Marvel comics
Josiah Power, in DC Comics
Michael Power (character), in Guinness advertising

See also
Power (disambiguation)#People
Powers (name)
David Baynton-Power (born 1961), British drummer
Paul Scully-Power (born 1944), American oceanographer

English-language surnames